Haddaf Abdullah Al-Ameri (born 21 November 1992) is a former Emirati footballer who played as a midfielder.

References

External links
 
 

Living people
1992 births
Emirati footballers
Al Ain FC players
Al Dhafra FC players
Ajman Club players
People from Al Ain
UAE First Division League players
UAE Pro League players
Association football midfielders